The 2001 Toledo Rockets football team represented the University of Toledo during the 2001 NCAA Division I-A football season. They competed as a member of the Mid-American Conference (MAC) in the West Division. The Rockets were led by head coach Tom Amstutz. Toledo's schedule originally included a game against Youngstown State on September 15, 2001, but that contest was canceled following the September 11 attacks.

Schedule

References

Toledo
Toledo Rockets football seasons
Mid-American Conference football champion seasons
Little Caesars Pizza Bowl champion seasons
Toledo Rockets football